Gelophaula aenea is a species of moth of the family Tortricidae. It is endemic to New Zealand.

Hosts

The larvae bore through the developing leaves of Celmisia lyalli.

References

Moths described in 1877
Archipini
Moths of New Zealand
Endemic fauna of New Zealand
Taxa named by Arthur Gardiner Butler
Endemic moths of New Zealand